Hugh Ware Cross (August 24, 1896 – October 15, 1972) was an American politician, lawyer, farmer, and businessman.

Born in Jerseyville, Illinois, Cross received his law degree from University of Illinois Law School. He practiced law in Jerseyville, Illinois, owned a farm, and was president of the Jersey County Abstract and Title Company. He was a Republican. From 1933 until 1941, Cross served in the Illinois House of Representatives and was speaker of the house in 1939. Then, from 1941 until 1949, Cross served as Lieutenant Governor of Illinois. In 1949, Cross was appointed to the Interstate Commerce Commission and was the chair in 1955. He then returned to his law practice and farm in Jerseyville, Illinois.

Notes

1896 births
1972 deaths
People from Jerseyville, Illinois
 University of Illinois College of Law alumni
Businesspeople from Illinois
Farmers from Illinois
Illinois lawyers
Members of the Illinois House of Representatives
Speakers of the Illinois House of Representatives
Lieutenant Governors of Illinois
People of the Interstate Commerce Commission
20th-century American politicians
20th-century American businesspeople
20th-century American lawyers